Switch adapted toys are toys which have been adapted so that their original switches are redirected to a larger switch that is easier for the child to interact with. Many children with limited fine and gross motor skills cannot play with regular battery-operated toys.

For children or young people who have profound and extremely limiting physical and intellectual disabilities, operating a switch adapted toy may be the first independent thing they can do, which builds confidence and enjoyment as well as intellectual stimulation and potential learning.

Depending on the user's abilities, different switches are available for different purposes, including: finger switches, foot switches and button switches of many different sizes and varieties. Some switches have special textural coverings - soft fabric, "squishy" latex, pom pom, or "bump" patterned for the visually impaired. Use of switches depends on the user's muscle tone, spasticity, visual ability, cognitive function and interests. Switch adapted toys can generate blinking or changing lights and music, speaking, vibration, noises, fans, aromatherapy, massage, songs with number, alphabet or nursery rhyme content and even voice recording and playback.

A number of suppliers exist in Australia but they use imported switch adapted toys which means the toys are expensive to buy. Toy libraries like Noah's Ark in Perth, Western Australia stock a good range of switch adapted toys so that families can borrow to explore the best type of switch and the most interesting toys for their child.

Toy libraries import switch adapted toys or have volunteer helpers who are able to take an existing battery operated toy and convert it to switch adapted. Toys which have only one function are perfect for adaptation but more complex, multi-function toys may not be so easy. Adapting a battery toy at home can be achieved with the use of a small number of tools.

A crowd funding page Toys for Tots through The Cerebral Palsy Alliance exists to generate funds needed to create a supply of switch adapted toys for use in a number of designated local libraries in Perth, starting a programme offering the toys to eligible children in locations closer to their homes.

There are many online guides that demonstrate how to adapt toys for switch activation, such as TheLaserguy2's "Santa's Switch Adapted Toys" series.

References

Electronic toys
Assistive technology